Sir Clive Ronald Woodward  (born 6 January 1956) is an English former rugby union player and coach. He was coach of the  team from 1997 to 2004, managing them to victory in the 2003 Rugby World Cup. He also coached the 2005 British & Irish Lions tour to New Zealand, losing the test series 3-0. He is currently a pundit for ITV Sport, working on their coverage of the Six Nations and Rugby World Cup.

Early life
Woodward was born in Ely, Cambridgeshire, the son of an RAF pilot. He started school at Corstorphine in Edinburgh and was later sent to the school ship HMS Conway, as his father disapproved of his ambition to play professional football. At Conway, he played rugby union at centre alongside fly-half Iain Duncan Smith, who would later become leader of the Conservative Party. According to Woodward, he was not selected to play for the Welsh Schoolboys side because he was English, but he was good enough to play rugby union for a Welsh school.

According to his autobiography, he applied to do a law degree at Durham University, but was turned down even though he was good enough and instead, he found a job at a London bank (NatWest).

Playing career 
His first club was Harlequins but he left to go to Loughborough University where he gained a Bachelor of Science degree in sports science followed by a Postgraduate Certificate in Education (PGCE). He then played as a centre for Leicester from 1979 to 1985. He made his England debut against  on 19 January 1980, as a replacement. England won the Grand Slam in that season, winning all their games. He went on to gain 21 caps for his country, playing his last game on 17 March 1984 against Wales. He was a player on the British Lions' 1980 tour to South Africa and 1983 tour to New Zealand. He was most noted for his centre partnership with fellow Tiger Paul Dodge. Playing for the Barbarians, he also won the Hong Kong Sevens in 1981.

Rugby coaching career 

He returned to the UK in 1990 to start his own IT leasing company and he became coach of the then obscure Henley, who were promoted to the national leagues. After a short but successful spell of coaching at London Irish. He became assistant coach at Leicester's arch rivals Bath under Andy Robinson.

When Jack Rowell retired as coach of the England team in 1997, Woodward acquired the job.
He had the job of transforming the England side from the amateur era into the professional one. Having been quoted as requesting that the press judge him on England's performance at the 1999 Rugby World Cup, when they were beaten by South Africa, his job was questioned. Thereafter England steadily improved under Woodward. England were Six Nations champions in 2000 and 2001, and completed the Grand Slam in 2003 with an emphatic 42–6 victory over Ireland in Dublin. England followed up by defeating the All Blacks in New Zealand for the first time since 1973, holding out for a 15–13 win despite being reduced to 13 men in the second half with two forwards in the sin bin. A week later reigning world champions Australia were beaten 25–14 in Melbourne, England's first ever win on Australian soil.

England entered the 2003 Rugby World Cup as betting favourites and the number one ranked team in the world. England won 20–17 thanks to a Jonny Wilkinson drop goal in the final seconds of extra time. Woodward was knighted in the 2004 New Year's honours. From 2000 to 2003, Woodward's England compiled a record of 41 wins from 46 matches, which included a perfect record of 20 wins and no losses at Twickenham and 12 successive wins against the Tri Nations. England remain the only team from the Northern Hemisphere to have won the World Cup. 

The England squad had to be re-built after the World Cup success, as a number of senior players retired, including captain Martin Johnson. Meanwhile, talismanic fly-half Jonny Wilkinson was sidelined with long-term injuries which would prevent him playing for England again for almost 4 years. England came third in the 2004 Six Nations, losing to Grand Slam winners France and Triple Crown winners Ireland. His last tour as England coach came shortly afterwards, with an ill-fated tour of New Zealand and Australia. England were beaten by New Zealand in two tests, without scoring a single try, going down 36–3 in the first and 36–12 in the second. The team then went to Australia, where they were beaten 51–15.

In February 2004 he was appointed head coach for the 2005 British & Irish Lions tour to New Zealand. The Lions lost the test series 3–0. Woodward's management was criticised by many commentators and players for his initial squad selection, his coaching methods, his handling of the players and the media, his selections on tour – particularly for keeping faith with the England players he knew well – and for not allowing the test team any time to play together before the test series began. He returned from New Zealand with his reputation within rugby severely tarnished.

On 24 October 2011, Woodward was inducted into the IRB Hall of Fame, alongside all other Rugby World Cup-winning head coaches and captains from the tournament's inception in 1987 through 2007 (minus the previously inducted John Eales).

Resignation and football coaching 
Woodward's contract with England was due to run until 2007. Following the retirement of key players like Lawrence Dallaglio and Martin Johnson, and finishing third in the Six Nations after the World Cup success, he found the politics of English rugby difficult to deal with, particularly the Premiership clubs' relations with the England management. Woodward was linked with a switch to football and, although he had denied these rumours, on 1 September 2004, Woodward announced that he would be quitting as England coach.

Initially, a move to Southampton Football Club seemed likely, as Woodward was a friend of chairman Rupert Lowe. Lowe discussed this possibility with the club's board on 2 September 2004. However, in his resignation press conference, Woodward said that his intention was to take the Football Association's Grade Two coaching badges after the 2005 British & Irish Lions tour to New Zealand:

You have to start at the bottom and I intend to do that.

However, Woodward continued his move into the Football League in 2005 by becoming Performance Director at Southampton Football Club, without undertaking any coaching at non-league clubs. With no experience of professional football, he again had problems with the politics of the situation, and was widely believed to have had a difficult relationship with the club's then-manager Harry Redknapp. For example, his appointee as head of sports science, Simon Clifford, left the club in November 2005, after only two months, amid resentment from the club's existing staff.

Following the departure of Redknapp in December 2005, Woodward was suggested as a possible candidate for the manager's position at the Championship club, despite his lack of experience in the game. He was subsequently appointed Director of Football to work alongside newly appointed Head Coach, George Burley. On 31 August 2006 it was confirmed by Southampton that he was no longer working at the club.

British Olympic Association 

On 6 September 2006 it was announced that Woodward would be returning to sport as the new director of elite performance for the British Olympic Association. This is a role similar to that for which he was believed to be a candidate at his former employers the Rugby Football Union (Rob Andrew was eventually appointed to the position).

In 2007, he was appointed to the board of directors of Leicester Tigers as a non-executive director.

On 6 March 2008, he had the privilege to run with the Olympic torch while going through Russell Square, London.

At the 2008 Summer Olympics in Beijing he acted as Deputy Chef de Mission and undertook a review of practices at the games in preparation for 2012 Summer Olympics in London.

It was announced 4 October 2012, Woodward will leave his post as director of sport at the British Olympic Association after six years.

Books

Woodward released his autobiography, Winning!, in 2004. He writes of the triumph of England in the 2003 Rugby World Cup, the preparations and celebrations, and of his personal life, his playing and coaching career. In Winning!, Woodward refers to Yehuda Shinar as one of the people who helped to turn the team around and who helped them win the World Cup. A biography of him, Clive Woodward: the biography, written by Alison Kervin, was published six months later.

Charity

Woodward is an Honorary President of the Wooden Spoon Society, a children's charity that harnesses the support of the rugby world. Woodward played in the annual Gary Player Invitational charity golf tournament to assist golf icon Gary Player raise funds for various children's causes.

Personal life
Clive Woodward is married to Jayne Williams; the couple formerly ran a computer leasing business together. They live near Maidenhead.

International matches as head coach
Note: World Rankings Column shows the World Ranking England was placed at on the following Monday after each of their matches

Record by country

Honours 
 Rugby World Cup
 Winner: 2003
 Quarter-finals: 1999
 Five/Six Nations Championship
 Winner: 2000, 2001, 2003
 Grand Slam: 2003
 Runner-up: 1998, 1999, 2002
 Third: 2004
 Triple Crown
 Winner: 1998, 2002, 2003
 Calcutta Cup
 Winner: 1998, 1999, 2001, 2002, 2003, 2004
 Millennium Trophy
 Winner: 1998, 1999, 2000, 2002, 2003
 Cook Cup
 Winner: November 2000, November 2001, November 2002, June 2003
 IRB International Coach of the Year
 Winner: 2003

Other honors 
 Henley Hawks
 Oxfordshire RFU County Cup
 Winner: 1991, 1992, 1993, 1994
 Courage South West 1
 Winner: 1992, 1994

See also
Eddie Jones
Bernard Laporte

References

External links
 Sporting heroes overview of playing career
 BBC report on his appointment at the B.O.A.
 Profile at scrum.com
 Analysis of Woodward's 10 Commandments on Winning
 Debrett's People of Today
 Sir Clive Woodward website

1956 births
Living people
Alumni of Loughborough University
British & Irish Lions coaches
British & Irish Lions rugby union players from England
England international rugby union players
England national rugby union team coaches
English rugby union coaches
English rugby union players
Harlequin F.C. players
World Rugby Awards winners
World Rugby Hall of Fame inductees
Knights Bachelor
Leicester Tigers players
Loughborough Students RUFC players
Officers of the Order of the British Empire
Rugby union players from Ely, Cambridgeshire
Rugby players and officials awarded knighthoods
Rugby union centres
Southampton F.C. non-playing staff
Sports scientists
People educated aboard HMS Conway
Association football coaches